= Flour factory San José =

Building in Toledo, Spain

Coordinates: 39.8562°N 4.0305°W

The Flour factory San José, located in Toledo, Spain, is a clear example of the industrial architecture of the late 19th century.

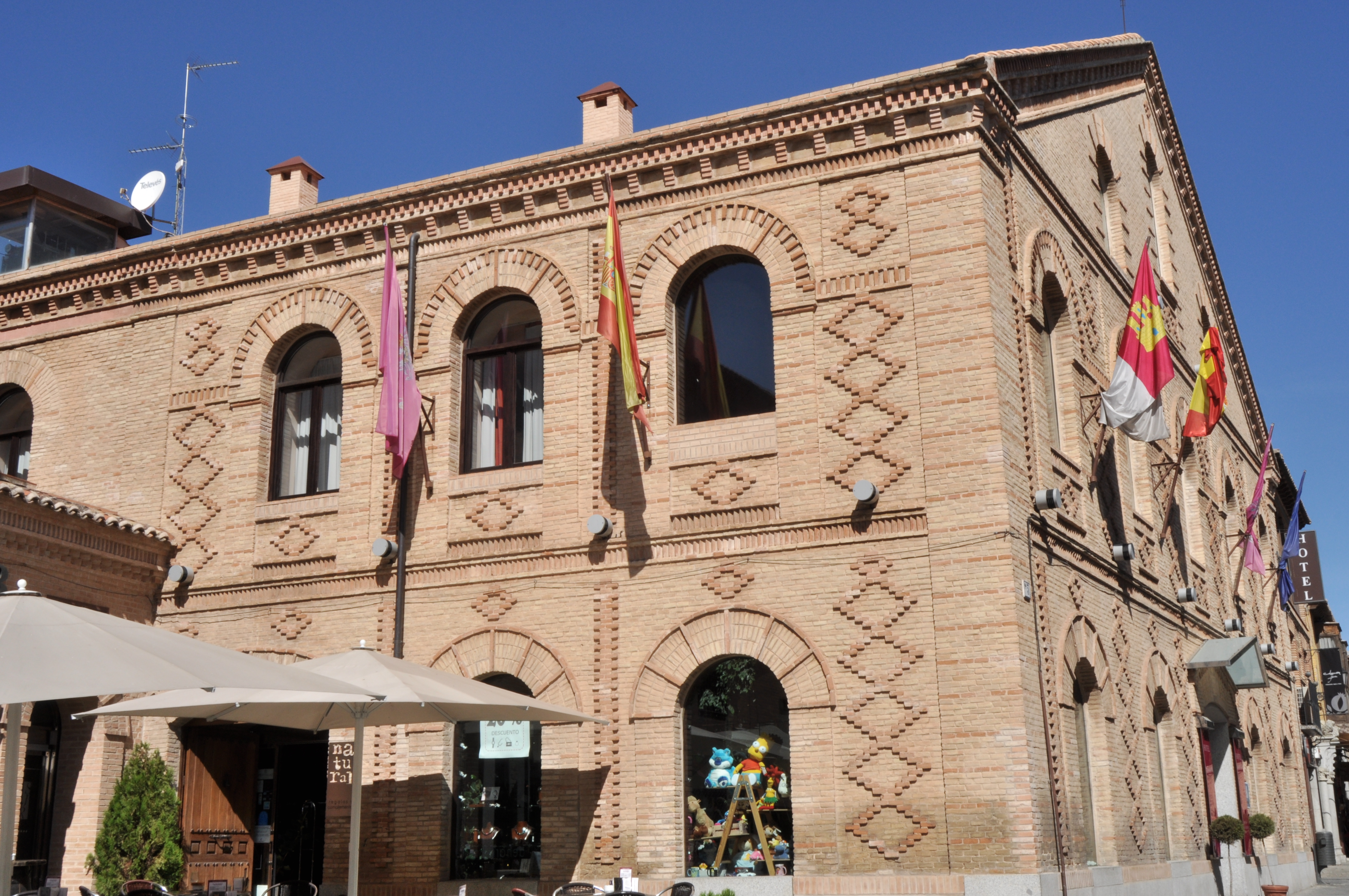
Flour factory San José

== Description ==
The building has a rectangular floor plan with two heights and a gable. On the ground floor is the cover, which is formed by a recessed arch with triangular cornice, decorated with mensulillas. On both sides of the itself open two windows with a semicircular arch and decoration in the voussoir, as a highlight of the voussoirs. The four windows present forge, delicately worked.

The main floor is covered by five hollows, of equal dimensions, built by semicircular arches with brick decoration in the voussoir and parapet. The hastial contains three half-point arch windows with voussoirs, also decorated, and parapet in the central window. The lower and main floors are decorated with rhombuses made of brick. The entire facade is framed by two pilasters with capitel made in brick. The imposition lines are also highlighted with brick.

The side façade, which faces calle Miradero del Barrionuevo, has two heights, with eight half-point windows per floor. The voussoir of these arches are highlighted with bricks of different coloration. Both the impost line and the cornice have the same characteristics of the main façade.

The other lateral facade repeats, in the first three spans of its two floors, the decoration of the former (first facade), keeping the rest with similar tones to the itself. The rear repeats the arrangement of holes, although all of them work as windows, except the left end of the ground floor, which remains covered. Attached to this back is a rectangular body, of two heights.

The roof is of two waters with Arab tile, and the attached body of the back presents three slopes and Arab tile. The interior is made up of a single nave. The cover is covered with a metallic armor made when the building was erected in 1889.
